Stormbreaker is a young adult action-adventure book written by British author Anthony Horowitz, and is the first novel in the Alex Rider series. The book was released in the United Kingdom on the 4th of September 2000, and in United States release on 21 May 2001, where it became a New York Times Bestseller. Since its release, the book has sold more than nine million copies worldwide, been listed on the BBC's The Big Read, and in 2005 received a California Young Reader Medal.

A film adaptation, starring Alex Pettyfer as Alex Rider, was released in 2005.

Plot summary
The protagonist, Alex Rider, after the suspicious death of his uncle, secretly becomes a teenage spy for MI6. He is sent undercover to Port Tallen, Cornwall. There he discovers the Stormbreaker computer factory where millions of computers were being filled with biological weapons which would give smallpox to the user. The aim of the attack was to kill hundreds of thousands of British schoolchildren and their teachers.

Critical reception
Critical reception for Stormbreaker was mixed to positive, with the book being placed on multiple ALA lists. Common Sense Media praised Stormbreaker for its action sequences, but criticised its dialogue and logic. Kirkus Reviews also commented that the book's plot was "preposterous" but stated that the readers "won't care".

Awards
Wisconsin Golden Archer Award (2003)
Rebecca Caudill Young Reader's Book Award (2004)
Utah Beehive Award (2004)
California Young Reader Medal (2005)
Iowa Teen Award (2005)
South Carolina Junior Book Award (2005)

Adaptations

Graphic novel
In 2005 a graphic novel adaptation of Stormbreaker was released in the United Kingdom and the United States. The graphic novel was an adaptation of the screenplay written for the movie released the same year, and was intended as a tie-in for the film.

Film

In 2006 a film adaptation of Stormbreaker was released to theatres starring Alex Pettyfer as Alex Rider with Geoffrey Sax directing. Critical reception for the film was average, with Stormbreaker holding only a 33% approval rating on Rotten Tomatoes with the consensus being that the film was "strictly children's fare, as it lacks originality, excitement, and believabiltity".

Video game

A video game adaptation of the film was released in 2006 under the name of Alex Rider: Stormbreaker for the Game Boy Advance and Nintendo DS. The game received mixed reviews, with IGN criticising the game and giving it a rating of 4/10.

References

External links
Official website of the books
Stormbreaker at Walker Books

Alex Rider novels
2000 British novels
Novels set in Cornwall
British novels adapted into films
Walker Books books